Peniche Everton Romualdo or simply Peniche (born January 16, 1979) is a former Brazilian professional footballer.

Club career
He made his debut in Russia in the Russian First Division in 1998 for FC Arsenal Tula.

Honours
 Russian Premier League champion: 1999.

References

1979 births
Living people
Brazilian footballers
Association football midfielders
Clube Atlético Juventus players
FC Arsenal Tula players
FC Spartak Moscow players
União Bandeirante Futebol Clube players
Russian Premier League players
Brazilian expatriate footballers
Expatriate footballers in Russia
FC Spartak-2 Moscow players